Del City is a city in Oklahoma County, Oklahoma, United States, and a part of the  Oklahoma City metropolitan area. The population was  21,822 at the United States Census, 2020.

Del City is located near two major interstate highways, both of which connect it to Oklahoma City. Interstate 40 bisects the town from the northwest to southeast, and Interstate 35 lies just a short distance west of the city. The city borders southeast Oklahoma City, Midwest City and Tinker Air Force Base. George Epperly, founded the city, which was incorporated by a vote of its residents in 1948. Del City is named after Epperly's eldest daughter, Delaphene Campbell. Since its incorporation Del City has expanded three times, first by annexing Carter Park in 1954, Midway Village in 1963 and the acquisition of an undeveloped piece of land between the city and Tinker AFB
A large area of Del City was significantly impacted by the May 3, 1999, tornado outbreak that passed through the Oklahoma City metro area.

History
Founded in Boone Township, Oklahoma County, as a "bedroom" community, Del City lies three miles (5 km) east of Oklahoma City and one mile (1.6 km) west of Midwest City. At the turn of the 21st century, Del City was a  community surrounded on the north, west, and south by Oklahoma City and on the east by Midwest City. Interstate Highway 40 bisects the town from the northwest to southeast. Oklahoma City streets define the boundaries: NE 10th Street on the north; Sooner Road on the east; SE 44th Street on the south; and Bryant Avenue on the west. Northwestern corner of the city is a mile from the junction of Interstate 35 and Interstate 40, justifying its claim to being "the Crossroads of America."

In the Land Run of 1889, Jordan Pybas and his wife settled in what is present-day Del City. Five generations later the family still lives in the house that was completed in 1907.  Before 1946 there were only two families living in what would become Del City. Developer George Epperly purchased a wheat field  large at the corner of SE 29th Street and Sunnylane Road in 1946 with a plan to build fifty houses. In 1948 there were 582 homes in Del City, 75% of which were built by George Epperly, Despite opposition, the unincorporated Epperly Heights and its 200 families voted to approve incorporation on October 9, 1948. In February 1959, Del City adopted a charter and a council-manager form of town government. The city was named for Epperly's daughter, Delaphene Campbell.

The city expanded through the annexation of Carter Park in 1954 and Midway Village in 1963. Del City attempted to annex the Rose Smith Addition but its residents incorporated and became the town of Smith Village.  The city also acquired a piece of undeveloped land that separated it from Tinker Air Force Base. Oklahoma City annexed this same piece of land, and a court fight ensued. In District court, Del City won and Oklahoma City appealed to the State Supreme Court. Del City officials, while awaiting the hearing, pursued negotiation again with Oklahoma City this time accepting  along the Tinker AFB boundary. Del City, having expanded to its greatest possible physical limits in 1964, joined Midwest City and Norman in underwriting the Little River Reservoir Project that became Lake Thunderbird.

The Del City Historical Society was organized in 1975 with Andy Evans as its first president. Several children of the Eighty-niners (89ers) still lived in the area, and they identified every original homestead within city limits. Residents also learned that their town was on the path of the 1870s Arbuckle Trail, a Texas to Kansas cattle trail. Wrestler and two-time Olympic Gold Medal winner John Smith resided in Del City.

With home building and family-oriented amenities the founding focus, industry was slow to develop in Del City to create any jobs (99 percent of Del Citians commuted to work in 1948, while only 96 percent commuted in 2000). Don's Alley Restaurant and Midwest Trophy Manufacturing are two businesses of long standing. Don Moore opened his hamburger grill at 4601 SE 29th Street in 1955, and as of 2018, still serves food in there. Midwest Trophy Manufacturing began in David R. Smith's garage in Del City in 1971. Midwest Trophy Manufacturing (now known as MTM Recognition) employs over 750 people throughout North America, 400 of them in Del City. It is the city's largest industry. MTM Recognition's corporate headquarters are in Del City at 3405 SE 29th Street.

Del City is represented in the Oklahoma Legislature by District 94 Representative Andy Fugate and District 46 Senator Kay Floyd who is in her third term. On the national level Del City is represented by 4th district Representative Tom Cole, and by U.S. Senators James Lankford and Markwayne Mullin.
Del City as had four newspapers Del City Leader, Del City Sun, Del City Times, and the Del City News. The city also has its own Government-access Channel (KDEL).

Geography

The city is located in the Frontier Country region in the center of the state.

Del City is in a region dominated by the Cross Timbers, an area of prairie and patches of forest at the eastern extent of the Great Plains. The region is essentially a transition buffer between the wetter and more forested Eastern Oklahoma and the semi-arid high plains of Western Oklahoma, and experiences extreme swings between dry and wet weather patterns. Climate is dominated by large differences in annual rainfall totals, with Central Oklahoma's western boundary receiving far less rain than compared to its eastern boundary. Because of these convergences of dry and wet weather patterns, Del City is located at the heart of what is known as Tornado Alley, and is in one of the most tornado-prone areas in the United States.
 
Eagle Lake is located within Del City; the lake is located in the northern part of the city and is the only large body of water. The lake is stocked with bass, catfish, bluegill, carp, vancuren trout and crappie.

Climate

Demographics

At the 2010 census, there were 21,332 people living in the city. The population of the city peaked at 28,523 in 1980, just before the oil bust and subsequent economic downturn. In 2000, the population density was 2,935.8 per square mile (1,133.1/km). The population 66.04 percent white, 17.07 percent African American, 4.03 percent Native American, 1.06 percent Asian, 0.02 percent Pacific Islander, and 7.06 percent of mixed race. Hispanics or Latinos of any race made up 7.02 percent of the population.

There were 8,669 households and 5,538 families in the city in 2010. There were 9,580 housing units at an average density of 1,290.2 per square mile (498.0/km). Of those 8,669 households, 27.6 percent had children under the age of 18, 38.9 percent were headed by married couples living together, 18.8 percent were headed by a female householder with no husband present, and 36.1 percent were non-families. 27.2 percent of all households were made up of individuals, and 2.9 percent had someone living alone who was 65 years of age or older. The average household size was 2.45 and the average family size was 3.04.

In 2010, 26.1 percent of the population were under the age of 18, 9.01 percent from 18 to 24, 26.0 percent from 25 to 44, 24.1% from 45 to 64, and 14.7 percent who were 65 years of age or older. The median age was 35 years. For every 100 females, there were 89.0 males. For every 100 females age 18 and over, there were 84.6 males.

The median household income was $32,218 and the median family income was $36,515. Males had a median income of $28,806 versus $21,997 for females. The per capita income for the city was $15,717. About 10.5 percent of families and 13.3% of the population were below the poverty line, including 20.8 percent of those under age 18 and 7.2 percent of those age 65 or over.

Government 

The City of Del City has operated under a council-manager form of city government since 1959. Floyd Eason was sworn in as Mayor on April 15, 2019. Four councilpersons represent each of the four wards of Del City. The city manager is currently held by Mike Cantrell. The Del City Police Department is headed by Police Chief Loyd Berger and is staffed by 34 full-time officers. The Del City Fire Department is headed by Fire Chief Brandon Pursell and is staffed by 30 full-time firefighters.

Economy
Del City borders Tinker Air Force Base, the largest single-site employer in Oklahoma. Other major employers in the area include Rose State College, AllianceHealth Midwest, base-affiliated companies and many of the major employers in the Oklahoma City metropolitan area.

Education

The Mid-Del School District is the main provider of education in Del City with one high school (Del City High School), one middle school (Del City Middle School), three elementary schools (Del City Elementary School, Epperly Heights Elementary School and Townsend Elementary School) located in Del City.

Del City also has two private schools (Destiny Christian School and Christian Heritage Academy). Rose State Community College is located within  of Del City.

Arts and culture

Annual cultural events 
An annual Armed Forces Day Parade is put on by the city and Shriners in May each year.

Museums and other points of interest 
Historical exhibits can be found at the Oklahoma County & Western Museum, Del City Preservation & Historical Society, and War Memorial. The Oklahoma Country Western Music Hall of Fame hosts regular bluegrass and country events.

War Memorial
The War Memorial located opposite the Del City Community Center has several monuments dedicated to those who were killed in combat who were either born or lived in Del City. The memorial is dedicated to twenty one servicemen killed while serving in various branches of the U.S. Military  during World War II, the Vietnam War and the Iraq War. Dedicated in November 2010, the memorials include an armored personnel carrier and a Fallen Soldier Battle Cross being watched over by two crouched U.S. servicemen. The memorial also has a time capsule.

Parks and recreation
Outdoor recreational areas include the Del City Ball Park, three bicycle and pedestrian trails, and Eagle Lake. The Eagle Harbor Aquatic Center water park is located behind the community center.

Religion

Del City's largest church, St. Paul the Apostle Catholic Church, was founded in 1956 as the St. Francis Xavier Church. The parish had grown to 340 families by 1966 and broke ground on a new building on  along Sunnylane Road. Its name was changed to St. Paul the Apostle Catholic Church in 1967.

1999 tornado

A large area of Del City was significantly damaged by the Bridge Creek–Moore F5 tornado that passed through the Oklahoma City metropolitan area on May 3, 1999. The tornado first touched down southwest of the community of Amber. The funnel was approximately a half-mile wide when it entered Del City as an F4 from the west near the intersection of S.E. 44th Street and Spiva Drive. The tornado continued on a north-northeast trajectory, exiting the city near Sooner Road and Woodview Drive. Hail and high winds were experienced by residents in the surrounding area. President Bill Clinton visited Del City and the surrounding areas a few days later to view the damage caused by the storm.

The tornado was the last to be classified as an F5 tornado in the United States under the original Fujita scale system before the Enhanced Fujita Scale was implemented in February 2007.  Even so, within a few years most of the area had been rebuilt. The only visible evidence of the tornado's path today include the cluster of newly constructed homes, the absence of large trees, and an interruption in the row of evergreen trees that lined Sooner Road between 44th Street and 29th Street.

A memorial stands along a walking and bike path on Sooner Road and is dedicated to the seven people who lost their lives during the May 3 tornado. United States Air Force Staff Sergeant James Day was killed in an ATV accident on May 8, 1999, while he was patrolling an area of Tinker AFB, Oklahoma, which had been damaged in the tornado. He is also listed on the memorial.

The tornado was the deadliest and most destructive of the numerous tornadoes that were part of the 1999 Oklahoma tornado outbreak. A 2006 National Geographic Channel documentary, Ultimate Tornado, discusses unusually violent tornado events and includes footage of the outbreak. The tornado ultimately claimed a total of 36 lives throughout the Oklahoma City metropolitan area.

Notable people
 Nick Blackburn, Major League Baseball player, pitched for the Minnesota Twins from 2008–2011.
 Scott Inman, former Democratic Leader and member of the Oklahoma House of Representatives (2006-2018) grew up in Del City and attended St. Paul the Apostle Catholic Church. 
 Bob Kalsu, All-American tackle at the University of Oklahoma and NFL player for the Buffalo Bills, attended Del City High School. Kalsu was one of only two professional football players killed in action during the Vietnam War the other being Don Steinbrunner who played for the Cleveland Browns. Kalsu was the last professional football player killed in action till Pat Tillman was killed in 2004. The schools football statdium is named in his honor.
 J. T. Realmuto (born 1991), Major League Baseball player for the Philadelphia Phillies
 Josh Scobey, former NFL player, later played for the UFL Las Vegas Locomotives football team.
 John Smith, two-time Olympic gold medalist at the 1988 and 1992 Summer Olympics in freestyle wrestling, grew up in Del City where he started wrestling, Del City High School's Field House is named in his honor.
 Pat Smith, younger brother of John Smith, first ever four-time NCAA Division I National Wrestling Champion

See also
List of towns and cities in Oklahoma by population

References

External links
 City Website
 Del City Chamber of Commerce
 Encyclopedia of Oklahoma History and Culture – Del City

 
Oklahoma City metropolitan area
Cities in Oklahoma
Cities in Oklahoma County, Oklahoma